Svetlana Valeryevna Shikshina (born March 7, 1980) is a professional Go player from Russia, one of only four western women to date to reach professional status. She achieved this in 2002, affiliated to the Hanguk Kiwon (the Korean Baduk Association).

Biography 
Svetlana Shikshina started playing go at the age of 10. She was trained by her father Valery Shikshin, who also tutored some of the best Russian players – Alexandre Dinerchtein, Andrei Kulkov and Ilya Shikshin (who is Svetlana's brother and a 3-dan professional.) She was Russian Female Champion from 1994 till 1996; in 1996 she won the European Female Championship.  In 2006 she won the overall European championship (her compatriot Alexandre Dinerchtein placed second).

In 1997, Svetlana moved to South Korea to study go professionally. In 2002 she was promoted to professional status and received 1-dan professional status. In 2008 she was promoted to 3-dan professional level. In 2005, she started an annual Children's Go Tournament, the Svetlana Shikshina Cup.

Achievements 

 One of the very few non-Asian players to reach professional playing strength.
 European Female Champion in 1996 and 2005.
 European Champion in 2006.
 1997 — 3rd place at the World female Championship.
 2001, 2011 — 1st place at the European Team Championship.
 2004 — winner of the European Ing Cup and a representative from Europe at the 17th Fujitsu Cup.
 2006 — 1st place at the European Masters Tournament.
 2007— European representative at the 21st Fujitsu Cup.
 2012–2016 — 1st place at the European Pair Go Championship

References

External links 
 
 European Go Database, Svetlana Shikshina's official rating entry at the European Go Federation
 Svetlana Shikshina's page at Sensei's Library

1980 births
Living people
Russian Go players
Female Go players
Sportspeople from Kazan